Dunedin  is a city in Pinellas County, Florida, United States. The name comes from Dùn Èideann, the Scottish Gaelic name for Edinburgh, the capital of Scotland. Dunedin is part of the Tampa-St. Petersburg-Clearwater metropolitan area and is the fifth largest city in Pinellas County. The population was 36,068 as of the 2020 census.

Dunedin is home to several beaches, including Dunedin Causeway, Honeymoon Island, and Caladesi Island State Park, which is consistently rated among the best beaches in the world. Dunedin is one of the few open waterfront communities from Sarasota to Cedar Key where buildings do not completely obscure the view of the Intracoastal Waterway and the Gulf of Mexico beyond; a  stretch of Edgewater Drive (also known as Alternate US 19) south of downtown offers views of St. Joseph Sound, Clearwater Beach, and Caladesi Island. Downtown Clearwater and Clearwater Beach are a  drive south on Edgewater.

History
Richard L. Garrison was the first person given a land grant in Dunedin in 1850. The settlement was originally named Jonesboro by George Jones, the owner of the area mercantile. Two Scotsmen, J.O. Douglas and James Somerville, later named the settlement Dunedin after applying for the first post office in northern Pinellas County. The name is taken from Scottish Gaelic Dùn Èideann, the Scottish Gaelic for Edinburgh. With a dock built to accommodate larger sailing vessels, Dunedin became an important trading center and at one time it had the largest fleet of sailing vessels in the state.

Dunedin became incorporated as a town in 1899 in part as a response to numerous complaints about pigs running rampant in the settlement, leading to a still-standing ban on livestock within city limits. By 1913, the town had a population of only 350. It became incorporated as the City of Dunedin in 1926.

Dunedin and the Roebling Alligator 
During and shortly before World War II the Food Machinery Corporation factory in Dunedin (now demolished) was the primary site for the production of the Landing Vehicle Tracked developed by FMC Dunedin's Engineers and Donald Roebling of Clearwater from Roebling's own Alligator.

Initial training on the LVTs was done at the FMC factory under the auspices of the first Amphibian Tractor School, led by Major William W. Davies. Until barracks and maintenance facilities were completed, the school and its students were housed in the Hotel Dunedin. After training, the Marines from the first Amphibian Tractor School were sent to flesh out the 1st Amphibian Tractor Battalion, which has served with distinction since. In mid-1944, the Marine unit in Dunedin was transferred to Camp Pendleton, California.

Geography

Dunedin is bordered by the city of Clearwater to the south and east, the Gulf of Mexico to the west, and by Palm Harbor (an unincorporated community of Pinellas County) to the north.

Neighborhoods
 Braemoor
 Osprey Place
 Stirling Heights
 Spanish Acres
 Spanish Place
 Lake Haven
 Virginia Crossing
 Waterford Crossing
 Fairway Estates
 Curlew Landings
 Golden Crest 
 New Athens City
 Lake Highlander
 Weathersfield
 Dunedin Mobile Manor
 Spring Lakes
 Spring Lake South
 Golden Acres
 Ranchwood Estates
 Amberlea
 Spanish Trails
 Trails West
 Barrington Hills
 Piper's Glen

Local government

Administration
The City of Dunedin currently operates under a nonpartisan commissioner-manager form of government. The commission comprises four commissioners and a mayor, who are elected by the registered voters under a staggered system.

The chief executive officer, known as the city manager, oversees the ten departments and the annual budget.

Currently, the Dunedin City Commission is made up of Mayor Julie Ward Bujalski, Vice-mayor Jeff Gow, Commissioner Maureen "Moe" Freaney, Commissioner Deborah Kynes, and Commissioner John Tornga. The city manager is Jennifer Bramley.

The city government is made up of ten departments with various divisions and sections. The departments are Administration, Human Resources, Information Services, Public Works, Parks & Recreation, Fire, Library, Community Services, Economical Development, Planning/Development and Finance. The Community Redevelopment Agency (CRA) oversees downtown projects and the needs of downtown Dunedin merchants and tourism.

Dunedin boasts an extensive Volunteer Services section, and enables all citizens the chance to have their opinions expressed and tended to. Currently, there are 39 boards and committees that serve as advisory groups to the city manager and the City Commission.

Law enforcement and fire
Dunedin Fire Department has 48 firefighters split into 16 members over three shifts. The department has 3 fire stations proving fire protection for Dunedin.

Pinellas County Sheriff Office's North District Patrol provides law enforcement for Dunedin.

Demographics

As of the 2020 census, Dunedin city had a population of 36,068 with 18,254 households. There were 1.95 people per household. 

Of the population, 92.0% were white, 2.5% were black or African American, 0.1% were American Indian or Alaska Native, 1.6% were Asian, 0.2% were Native Hawaiian and other Pacific Islander, 2.9% were two or more races, and 5.0% were Hispanic or Latino. There were 3,335 veterans living in the city. 8.4% were foreign born persons. 

3.3% of the population were under 5 years old, 10.6% were under 18 years old, and 36.3% were 65 years and older. 54.3% were female persons. 

The median value of owner-occupied housing units was $248,200. The median gross rent was $1,178. 92.1% of households had a computer and 84.0% had a broadband internet subscription. 94.7% of the population aged 25 years or older had a high school degree or higher. 36.3% of the population aged 25 years or older had a Bachelor’s degree or higher. The median household income was $55,729. The per capita income for 12 months was $39,646. 9.7% of the population lived below the poverty threshold.

Economy
Dunedin previously hosted an office of Nielsen Media Research. In 2003 the company consolidated its employees in a new complex in Oldsmar, Florida, with workers from Dunedin and other areas in Pinellas County moving into the Oldsmar Building.

Until early 2005, Dunedin was the home of Nielsen Media Research's production operations. The city is home to multiple breweries including Dunedin Brewery, Florida's oldest microbrewery.

TD Ballpark and Englebert Complex are used by the Dunedin Blue Jays and spring training facilities for the Toronto Blue Jays since 1977. TD Ballpark was built on the former Grant Field c. 1930.

The downtown business district is notable for its absence of large commercial signage, corporate franchise restaurants or chain retail stores. The Pinellas Trail, a  bicycle and pedestrian trail that traverses all of Pinellas County, bisects downtown Dunedin.  A large portion of the trail lies on the former roadbed of the Orange Belt Railway, the first railroad in Pinellas County, which arrived in 1888.

Controversy
Dunedin has been accused of draconian fining of its residents. In one case, it sued a former resident to collect over a hundred thousand dollars for yard and swimming pool maintenance. There are cases where the city has charged tens of thousands of dollars over uncut grass or aesthetic city code violations. The city has a $250 to $500 per day accruing violation policy per city code § 22-79(d). "In 5½ years, the city has collected nearly $3.6 million in fines, sometimes tens of thousands at a time, for violating laws that prohibit grasses taller than 10 inches, recreational vehicles parked on streets at certain hours or sidings and bricks that don't match." The case was dropped about a month after it was initiated (in 2019) due to intense national scrutiny over the matter.

Culture

Traditions

Sister city to Stirling, Scotland, Dunedin has maintained and embraced its Scottish roots. Once a year, Scottish clans descend upon the city for the Dunedin Highland Games. Both Dunedin High School and Dunedin Highland Middle School have competition-level pipe and drum bands. The high school's marching band is known as the Scottish Highlander Band, and both teen and adult members make up the City of Dunedin Pipe Band.

In addition to the Highland Games, Dunedin hosts many other annual festivals. The most popular among these is Dunedin's Mardi Gras celebration, during which thousands of visitors descend on the small town.

Historic buildings  
Located on Edgewater Drive, the Fenway Hotel is a historic hotel that saw many famous guests throughout its lifetime.

Other historic structures in Dunedin:

 Andrews Memorial Chapel, built in 1888
 J. O. Douglas House, built in 1880
 Willis S. Blatchley House, built in 1916
 Dunedin Golf Club 11th Hole Bridge, 1926

Recreation

The city of Dunedin contains a Parks & Recreation Department, which provides low-cost recreation programming to the city's residents. The city operates four recreation facilities, each one designed to provide resources for a specific age group.

In 2007, Dunedin opened its newest and largest recreation facility, the Dunedin Community Center at a cost of just over $10 million. The project was mostly paid for by the "Penny for Pinellas" tax. The St. Petersburg Times wrote that Marston "figured that since the county needs recreation programs of its own and the city needs a new community center, why not ask the county to pay for the project in exchange for access to the new facility." Marston's proposal marked a turning point for the city as it saved Dunedin taxpayers millions, and allowed Dunedin officials to replenish vital strategic reserves. The center features classrooms / multi-purpose rooms, dance and exercise rooms, fitness center, gymnasium, kids area, gaming room, library, playground, rental facility, stage.

The Dunedin Fine Art Center (DFAC), opened in 1975 has grown to be one of the most renowned centers for visual art instruction and exhibition in the southeastern United States. Tampa Bay Times writer Lennie Bennett says that DFAC is "the artistic equivalent of a village square," offering quality experiences to people of all ages.

Since 1977, Dunedin has been the spring training home of the Toronto Blue Jays, as well as the class-A Dunedin Blue Jays of the Florida State League. In April and May 2021, the Toronto Blue Jays played their regulation games at TD Ballpark in Dunedin, due to COVID-19 cross-border restrictions. Dunedin is one of the smallest communities used by Major League spring training teams, although surrounded by a large metropolitan area. TD Ballpark is situated next to the Dunedin Public Library a few blocks south of downtown on Douglas Avenue, and is just two blocks east of Edgewater Drive.  The stadium was built as a replacement to Grant Field, the Blue Jays' first spring training ball park. The library was founded in 1895 and is the oldest public library in Pinellas County.

Other recreation facilities includes:

 Martin Luther King, Jr. Recreation Center – classrooms, game room, gymnasium, outdoor basketball courts, picnic area, playground, rental space, skate park, teen room
 Hale Seniors Activity Center – ballroom event rooms, classrooms, meeting rooms, exercise room, computer room, game room, gift shop, rental rooms
 Dunedin Nature Center
 Highlander Pool Complex/Kiwanis Spraygrounds – outdoor pool open from April to September
 Dunedin Country Club – a semi-private golf course with memberships available and the course is open to the public. The course was deeded to the city of Dunedin for recreational purposes in 1930 by the Contract Investment Company.

The city has a large athletic base, with community soccer, baseball, hockey, and softball teams. Dunedin reflected the Gaelic origins of its name by playing host to a short lived American shinty club, Dunedin Camanachd, in the mid-2000s.

In 2011 the City of Dunedin passed ordinance 2011-04 which authorized the street-legal use of golf carts across approximately 60% of the city.

City owned parks include:

 Achieva Paw Park
 Amberlea Park and Playground
 Dunedin Recreation Center and Playground
 Eagle Scout Park
 Edgewater Park and Playground - waterfront park with marinas and kayak launch area
 Elizabeth Skinner-Jackson Park and Playground - features a basketball court
 Hammock Park and Playground - located next to baseball fields used by Greater Dunedin Little League
 Happy Tails Dog Park (closed February 2019)
 Highlander Park
 Josiah Cephas Weaver Park and Playground
 Martin Luther King Jr. Recreation Center and Playground
 Scotsdale Park and Playground
 VFW Playground

Honeymoon Island State Park and Caladesi Island State Park are located in Dunedin along St. Joseph Sound on the west side.

The city-owned Dunedin Marina has 194 boat slips and is one of the finest municipal marinas on the West Coast of Florida. The marina is located on the Intracoastal Waterway between Dunedin Causeway and Clearwater Causeways. It is home to the Dunedin Boat Club, one of Florida's oldest Sailing Clubs.

Library

The Dunedin Public Library has two branches, the Dunedin Main Library (located at 223 Douglas Ave) and the Friends Branch Library (located at 1920 Pinehurst Road), which opened in 2007. The library is considered the oldest library in Pinellas County. In 1895 Christopher B Bouton, a resident from Cleveland, gave the city of Dunedin 200 books for public use. Mr. Bouton's brother owned the town's meeting hall but gave ownership of it to the Dunedin Library Association to house the public library and a reading room. The building became known thereafter as Library Hall. In 1935, the City of Dunedin took over the Library when the collection grew to be 7,000 titles. As the population of Dunedin and the usage of the library grew, the facility was in need of more space. Two new libraries were built, one in 1956 on Louden Avenue and another in 1964 on Main Street. In 1976 the Library leased and moved into a vacant space in the Douglas Plaza Shopping Center, which was purchased by the City of Dunedin for the Library in 1986. In 1989, the estate of Franklin Chase Milliken, a retired attorney, was left to the City of Dunedin to benefit the Dunedin Public Library. After years of planning, the City Commission approved funding for a 38,000 square foot building in 1994, costing approximately $3.5 million. Soon after the Library's centennial in April 1995, the collection was moved into trailers while the old building was torn down and a new one was built in the same location. The new building opened to the public on September 3, 1996.

As part of their offerings and services, the Dunedin Public Library offers monthly delivery service to homebound residents of Dunedin. Other offerings include a seed library where patrons can check out seeds for gardening, a knitting and crocheting group, and genealogy assistance.  The Dunedin Public Library initiated a Little Free Library movement in Pinellas County. There are currently thirteen Little Free Libraries within Dunedin. The Literacy Council of Upper Pinellas, Inc., which promotes adult literacy in North Pinellas County, serves the Dunedin Public Library.

Dunedin Public Library is currently a part of the Pinellas Public Library Cooperative (PPLC), a coalition of all public libraries within Pinellas County, Florida.

Infrastructure
Dunedin's major highway US Route 19 Alternate connects the city with the rest of Florida, while Main Street and Pinellas County Road 1 provides local connections.

The closest airport is St. Petersburg-Clearwater International Airport located southeast of Dunedin.

Notable people
 Clayton Andrews, former MLB pitcher
 Nadia Azzi, classical pianist, child prodigy
 Sean Burnett, former MLB relief pitcher
 Mike "Pinball" Clemons, player and coach of the CFL's Toronto Argonauts; born and raised in Dunedin, and graduated from Dunedin High School
 Ron DeSantis, governor of Florida
 Sylvia Earle, oceanographic explorer and marine biologist
 John G. Hanna, sailboat designer, designed the Tahiti ketch
 Jim Hendry, special assistant to the New York Yankees, former GM of the Chicago Cubs
 Doron Jensen, restaurateur and co-founder of Homestyle Buffet 
 Michael D. Knox, psychologist, antiwar activist and scholar
 George Lowe, TV actor best known for playing Space Ghost on Space Ghost Coast to Coast
 Daniel Norris, MLB pitcher for the Detroit Tigers
 David Nutter, TV director for numerous shows including Game of Thrones and The X-Files; graduate of Dunedin High School
 Donnie Scott, former MLB catcher
 Frank Sprogell, professional golfer and golf course architect
 Lari White, country singer
 Mike White, Head Coach for the Georgia Bulldogs men's basketball team
 Henry S. Whitehead, author of weird fiction, fantasy, horror, mainly published in Weird Tales magazine
 Bobby Wilson, former MLB catcher who is currently the catching coordinator for the Texas Rangers
 Don Zimmer, former baseball player, coach and manager respectfully for Brooklyn Dodgers, New York Mets, Chicago Cubs, New York Yankees and Tampa Bay Rays

Gallery

References

External links

 City of Dunedin official website
 City of Dunedin Tourism site
 Creative Loafing's Neighborhood Guide: DUNEDIN

 
Beaches of Florida
Beaches of Pinellas County, Florida
Cities in Florida
Cities in Pinellas County, Florida
Populated coastal places in Florida on the Gulf of Mexico
Scottish-American history
1899 establishments in Florida